Cyrtopogon may refer to:

Cyrtopogon (fly), a genus of flies in the family Asilidae
Cyrtopogon (plant), a genus of plants in the family Poaceae